Alférez FAP Alfredo Vladimir Sara Bauer Airport (official name Alférez FAP Vladimir Sara Bauer Airport)  is a small regional airport serving Andoas, in the northern Loreto Region of Peru. It is currently not served by any scheduled airline but it is by private and charter airlines.

The airport is named after Vladimir Enrique Sara Bauer, who died in a helicopter accident on October 6, 1977.

Airlines and Destinations

Accidents and incidents
On May 5, 1998, the 1998 Occidental Petroleum Boeing 737 crash took place near the airport, when a chartered Boeing 737 crashed near the airport, killing 75 out of 88 occupants.

See also
Transport in Peru
List of airports in Peru

References

External links
 
OurAirports - Andoas
SkyVector Aeronautical Charts

Airports in Peru
Buildings and structures in Loreto Region